The statue of Germán Valdés, also known as Tin Tan, is installed along Genova Street in Zona Rosa, Mexico City, Mexico.

References

External links

 

Cuauhtémoc, Mexico City
Monuments and memorials in Mexico City
Outdoor sculptures in Mexico City
Sculptures of men in Mexico
Statues in Mexico City